The 1924 South Dakota State Jackrabbits football team was an American football team that represented South Dakota State University in the North Central Conference during the 1924 college football season. In its seventh season under head coach Charles A. West, the team compiled a 7–1 record, won the conference championship, and outscored opponents by a total of 105 to 28.

Schedule

References

South Dakota State
South Dakota State Jackrabbits football seasons
North Central Conference football champion seasons
South Dakota State Jackrabbits football